Henriette Reker (born 9 December 1956) is a German lawyer and independent politician. She is known for her pro-immigration stance and for being the victim of an assassination attempt in 2015. A day after the attack, Reker was elected mayor of Cologne after gaining 52.66% of the votes. She is the first female mayor elected in Cologne's history. Reker was re-elected in 2020.

Early career

Born in Cologne, Reker worked as legal counsel for the State Association of Guild Health Insurance Funds in Münster from 1992 until 2000.

Political career
From 2000 until 2010, Reker served as deputy mayor for Social Affairs, Health and Consumer Protection of Gelsenkirchen. In 2010 she was appointed a mayoral deputy for social affairs, integration and the environment of the city of Cologne.

Supported by the CDU, FDP, and The Greens, Reker ran for Mayor of Cologne in October 2015 and was re-elected in September 2020.

Assassination attempt

At a public event on 17 October 2015, the day before the mayoral election, Reker was seriously wounded when a 44-year-old man stabbed her in the neck with a knife, while shouting about an "influx of refugees". State prosecutors confirmed the attack to be politically motivated, after the perpetrator "confessed to having xenophobic motives at the uncontrolled influx of migrants". As a member of Cologne's municipal administration, Reker had been responsible for the housing and integration of refugees. Her aide was also hurt in the attack, as were three other people who had tried to subdue her attacker. Reker's main rival in the mayoral election, Social Democrat Jochen Ott, suspended his campaign after the attack. Reker won the election while remaining in the intensive care unit of a local hospital.

Federal prosecutors soon took over the case from state prosecutors in Cologne on grounds of the particularly dangerous nature of the stabbing, which came against the backdrop of a rising tide of attacks on accommodations for refugees in Germany. In late October, they charged a 44-year-old German man with attempted murder and dangerous bodily harm. At the time, the authorities said the perpetrator was driven by his anger over Reker's work on the refugee issue. The attacker was sentenced to fourteen years in prison, with Reker recovering to testify at the trial.

New Year's Eve sexual assaults on women

Reker was accused of victim blaming following the attacks at Cologne's 2016 New Year's Eve celebrations. She claimed that "there's always the possibility of keeping a certain distance of more than an arm's length – that is to say to make sure yourself you don't look to be too close to people who are not known to you, and to whom you don't have a trusting relationship". Reker was condemned by Lodewijk Asscher, Deputy Prime Minister of the Netherlands, for implying that women could have prevented the attacks against themselves. Reker accused the media of taking her comments out of context: she claimed that she had only reacted to a reporter's question by quoting an existing communal guideline for safety during partying in a speech.

Other activities

Corporate boards
 Cologne Bonn Airport, ex-officio member of the supervisory board
 Koelnmesse, ex-officio chairwoman of the supervisory board
 NRW.BANK, member of the advisory board
 Rheinenergie, member of the advisory board
 RWE, member of the advisory board
 Stadtwerke Köln, ex-officio member of the supervisory board

Non-profit organizations
 1. FC Köln, member of the advisory board (since 2019)
 Theodor Heuss Foundation, member of the board of trustees (since 2019)
 Academy of Media Arts Cologne (KHM), member of the board of trustees
 Technical University of Cologne, member of the board of trustees
 Stiftung Lebendige Stadt, member of the board of trustees
 German Society for Photography (DGPh), member
 Kölnische Karnevalsgesellschaft, member
 Soroptimist International (SI), Member
 Amerika Haus e.V. NRW, ex-officio member of the board of trustees
 Stiftung Stadtgedächtnis, member of the board of trustees
 Society for Control of Common Diseases in the Ruhr District, chairwoman
 Kliniken der Stadt Köln gGmbH, member of the supervisory board (2011–2015)
 Godeshöhe Neurological Rehabilitation Center, member of the supervisory board (2011–2015)
 RehaNova Neurological and Neurosurgical Rehabilitation Clinic, member of the supervisory board (2011–2015)

References

External links 

  
 Curriculum vitae on the website of the City of Cologne 

1956 births
German victims of crime
Living people
Stabbing survivors
Mayors of Cologne
21st-century German women politicians